Andrew Malcolm Preston (born 1973) is a Canadian historian, who won the 2013 Charles Taylor Prize for his book Sword of the Spirit, Shield of Faith: Religion in American War and Diplomacy. He is also a fellow at Clare College, Cambridge.

Education
Preston is a Professor of American history at the University of Cambridge. Originally from Ontario, Canada, Preston was educated at the University of Toronto, the London School of Economics (LSE), and Sidney Sussex College, Cambridge University. He previously taught at the University of Victoria and at Yale University where he was a postdoctoral educator.

Research
Preston is the author of Sword of the Spirit, Shield of Faith: Religion in American War and Diplomacy which won the Charles Taylor Prize in 2013. His prior publications include The War Council: McGeorge Bundy, the NSC, and Vietnam (2006) and Nixon in the World: U.S. Foreign Relations, 1969–1977 (2008).

Awards

In 2013, Preston was awarded the Charles Taylor Prize in Non-Fiction Books for his book Sword of the Spirit, Shield of Faith: Religion in American War and Diplomacy.

References

External links
Andrew Preston

1973 births
21st-century Canadian historians
21st-century Canadian male writers
Alumni of Sidney Sussex College, Cambridge
Alumni of the London School of Economics
Canadian expatriate academics in the United Kingdom
Canadian male non-fiction writers
Fellows of Clare College, Cambridge
Historians from Ontario
Historians of American foreign relations
Living people
People from Brockville
University of Toronto alumni